Romell Gumbs (born 12 November 1985) is an Anguillan international footballer who plays as a defender.

Career
Gumbs has played club football in England for Slough Town.

He made two international appearances for Anguilla in 2008.

Personal life
He is the cousin of fellow player Jermaine Gumbs.

References

1985 births
Living people
Anguillan footballers
Slough Town F.C. players
Association football defenders
Anguilla international footballers
Sportspeople from Slough
English footballers
Footballers from Berkshire